French Paper Company is an American paper mill based in Niles, Michigan. It has been family owned since it was founded in 1871. The company produces premium specialty uncoated colored paper, colored envelopes and custom paper for graphic arts, printing, specialty, gifts and more.

The company is located along the St. Joseph River and since 1922 it has sourced its electricity from its own renewable hydroelectric power plant at the Niles, Michigan dam. French Paper also makes the majority of its papers using recycled fibers making it a very environmentally conscious manufacturer.

French Paper is well known amongst the graphic design industry due largely in part to its long standing relationship with CSA Design and the promotional materials it creates.

References

Manufacturing companies based in Michigan
Papermaking in the United States
Pulp and paper companies of the United States
Niles, Michigan